Five Corners is a census-designated place (CDP) in Clark County, Washington, United States. The population was 18,159 at the 2010 census, up from 12,207 at the 2000 census.

Geography
Five Corners is located in southern Clark County at  (45.682170, -122.569312). It is bordered by Walnut Grove to the southwest, Barberton to the northwest, Brush Prairie to the north, Orchards to the east, and the city of Vancouver to the south. Interstate 205 forms the southwest edge of the CDP, and Washington State Route 503 forms the eastern edge.

Demographics

As of the census of 2000, there were 12,207 people, 4,100 households, and 3,222 families residing in the CDP. The population density was 1,977.8 people per square mile (763.9/km2). There were 4,306 housing units at an average density of 697.7/sq mi (269.5/km2). The racial makeup of the CDP was 88.65% White, 1.65% African American, 0.88% Native American, 3.99% Asian, 0.62% Pacific Islander, 1.52% from other races, and 2.70% from two or more races. Hispanic or Latino of any race were 4.14% of the population. 19.5% were of German, 10.0% American, 9.9% English and 9.0% Irish ancestry according to Census 2000.

There were 4,100 households, out of which 40.6% had children under the age of 18 living with them, 63.5% were married couples living together, 10.3% had a female householder with no husband present, and 21.4% were non-families. 15.1% of all households were made up of individuals, and 4.0% had someone living alone who was 65 years of age or older. The average household size was 2.96 and the average family size was 3.29.

In the CDP, the age distribution of the population shows 30.2% under the age of 18, 8.0% from 18 to 24, 32.4% from 25 to 44, 23.5% from 45 to 64, and 5.9% who were 65 years of age or older. The median age was 33 years. For every 100 females, there were 99.5 males. For every 100 females age 18 and over, there were 98.5 males.

The median income for a household in the CDP was $51,688, and the median income for a family was $55,302. Males had a median income of $41,200 versus $27,630 for females. The per capita income for the CDP was $19,570. About 3.1% of families and 5.7% of the population were below the poverty line, including 5.9% of those under age 18 and 4.7% of those age 65 or over.

References

Census-designated places in Clark County, Washington
Census-designated places in Washington (state)